The Diensteinheit IX was a special and covert counter-terrorism unit of the German Democratic Republic Volkspolizei. It was not the same as the 9. Volkspolizei-Kompanie (English: 9th People's Police Company) since its structure was meant to handle anti-riot duties in East Germany.

History
The Munich massacre in 1972 and the increasing crime in East German cities led to initial attempts to create specialized police units in East Germany. With the establishment of the GSG 9 and Spezialeinsatzkommandos (SEK) in the early 1970s in West Germany, the Government of the German Democratic Republic (East Germany) initiated the creation of a similar unit. Since no comparable force existed in East Germany at that time, it had to be created from scratch, i.e. from intelligence reports about Western and Soviet special forces units.

The unit had been created in 1973 with provisional units before it was fully established in 1974 by Ernst Fabian with 30 men initially under the unit, being involved in the security of the Leipzig Fair. The unit was also armed with West German-made small arms and equipment.

In the 1980s, DIX operators were involved in hunting down known sex offenders in the Babelsberg district of Potsdam.

Upon German reunion in 1990, some members of the Diensteinheit IX were merged into the Spezialeinsatzkommandos of West Germany after thorough political evaluation procedures, such as with SEK units in Mecklenburg-Vorpommern and in Sachsen-Anhalt.

In 1992, Der Spiegel reported that DIX was able to get most of their non-Eastern bloc weapons by using arms dealers, some with Colombian firearms licenses and import them through Bangladesh to avoid detection. Previously, Heckler & Koch offices were searched in 1991 with warrants issued to see if they've violated firearms restrictions with said imports.

There were also reports that Import-Export GmbH and Kommerzielle Koordinierung was responsible for covertly acquiring the unit's needed gear.

Mandate
The unit was tasked with counter-terrorism operations including:
Hostage rescue
VIP protection
Law enforcement in high-risk situations
Physical security for large events, i.e. the World Festival of Youth and Students
Manhunt of deserted Soviet Soldiers

Organization
The unit answered directly to the Head of the Ministry for State Security. DIX teams were usually formed up to 10 men.

DIX was stationed in various locations, including Rostock, Schwerin, Magdeburg Leipzig Erfurt, Karl-Marx-Stadt (now Chemnitz), Dresden and Potsdam. The unit was also located in East Berlin.

Recruitment
Members of the Diensteinheit IX were recruited from the East German Volkspolizei. Prospective members had to be between 25 and 39 years old. Candidates had to fulfill stringent physical and psychological requirements. Also, they had to be graduates from an officer's school.

Gear

Weapons

 KM66 knife
  Makarov pistol
 PSM pistol
 Skorpion vz. 61
 Heckler & Koch MP5
 PM-63 RAK 
 AKM
 Heckler & Koch HK33
 SSG 82 sniper rifle
 SVD Dragunov

Equipment
 Strichtarn uniforms 
 PSH-77 helmets
 ZhZT-7 body armor

References

Further reading

 

Defunct police units of East Germany
Police tactical units
1974 establishments in East Germany
Stasi